Anosimena is a municipality in Madagascar. It belongs to the district of Miandrivazo, which is a part of Menabe Region. The population of the commune was estimated to be approximately 6,000 in 2001 commune census.

Only primary schooling is available. The majority 50% of the population of the commune are farmers, while an additional 30% receives their livelihood from raising livestock. The most important crop is beans, while other important products are maize and rice.  Services provide employment for 10% of the population. Additionally fishing employs 10% of the population.

History
This town was captured by the French troops from Sakalava defenders on 12 August 1897 during the Franco-Hova Wars.

References 

Populated places in Menabe